Adil El Arbi (born June 30, 1988) and Bilall Fallah (born January 4, 1986) are Belgian film and television directors of Moroccan descent. The duo, collectively billed as Adil & Bilall, are known for writing and directing the feature films Image (2014), Black (2015), and Gangsta (2018), as well as directing Bad Boys for Life (2020), the third installment of the Bad Boys franchise starring Will Smith and Martin Lawrence.

Career
Adil El Arbi and Bilall Fallah met during their film studies at the Hogeschool voor Wetenschap en Kunsten in Schaerbeek, Brussels, Belgium. During their studies, the first project that they directed was a short film named Broeders (2011), which was appreciated by critics; their later films, Black (2015) and Patser (2018), also received positive reception. They directed the first two episodes in the TV series Snowfall, which aired on July 5 and 12 in 2017, as well as Dimitri Vegas & Like Mike's music video "When I Grow Up", which features American rapper Wiz Khalifa. Besides directing Bad Boys for Life, the duo were also attached to direct Beverly Hills Cop IV, the fourth installment of the Beverly Hills Cop film series, in which Eddie Murphy is set to reprise his role. The duo also directed and executive produced Ms. Marvel for Disney+. In May 2021, it was announced that the duo would direct a film based on Batgirl for HBO Max. In April 2022, it was announced that the duo will no longer direct Beverly Hills Cop IV. In August 2022, after Warner Bros. Discovery made the decision to write the film off for tax purposes, it was announced that the movie Batgirl would not be released. With a reported $90 million budget, Batgirl is one of the highest budget movies in history to be produced, but not released. By February 2023, the duo signed on to direct Bad Boys IV.

Filmography
Short film

Feature film

Television

References

External links 
 
 

1980s births
Belgian people of Moroccan descent
Belgian film directors
Belgian television directors
Filmmaking duos
Living people
English-language film directors